There are 50 passenger ferry quays in Istanbul, of which 37 are in active service in Bosphorus, Golden Horn and the Sea of Marmara. As of the 2017 Summer season, the ferry quays are served at 600 voyages daily by 28 traditional passenger ferry boats on 17 lines operated by the Şehir Hatları ("City Lines") company.

Quays 
Following is the list of active ferry quays:

See also

Ferries in Istanbul
Public transport in Istanbul

References

Transport in Istanbul
Bosphorus
Golden Horn
Sea of Marmara
Ferry terminals in Turkey
Istanbul-related lists